Tekmeh Dash is a city in East Azerbaijan Province, Iran.

Tekmeh Dash or Tokmeh Dash may also refer to:
 Tekmeh Dash, East Azerbaijan
 Tokmeh Dash, Hamadan
 Tekmeh Dash, Zanjan
 Tekmeh Dash District, in East Azerbaijan Province

See also
 Tikmeh Dash (disambiguation)